Barton River may mean the following rivers:

 Barton River, in Vermont, United States
Barton River, in Western Australia, Australia